Matthias Lüthen is a German businessman and racing driver. He is the founder and managing director of real estate agency Lüthen & Co. Immobilien, and currently competes in the Prototype Cup Germany driving a Duqueine M30 - D08 LMP3 for Mühlner Motorsport.

Racing record

Racing career summary 

† As Lüthen was a guest driver, he was ineligible for points.
* Season still in progress.

Complete Asian Le Mans Series results 
(key) (Races in bold indicate pole position) (Races in italics indicate fastest lap)

References

External links 
 

Living people
German racing drivers
Formula Renault Eurocup drivers
Euroformula Open Championship drivers
Year of birth missing (living people)
F3 Asian Championship drivers
Drivex drivers
Double R Racing drivers
Pinnacle Motorsport drivers
Motopark Academy drivers
Asian Le Mans Series drivers
Sportspeople from Hamburg
Le Mans Cup drivers